Sundarbans usually refers to the Sundarbans' freshwater swamp forests, the term applying generally to a tropical moist broadleaf forest ecoregion of Bangladesh and India. It may specifically refer to:

 The Sundarbans delta itself, which hosts the largest mangrove forest in the world and lies at the mouth of the Ganges and is spread across areas of Bangladesh and West Bengal, India.
 Sundarbans National Park - this national park is situated in the aforementioned delta
 Sundarbans Reserve Forest - this complex of forests in Bangladesh is made up of three wildlife sanctuaries
 Sundarbans settlements - area cleared for human settlement 
 Sundarbans tiger project - a Bangladesh Forest Department initiative to protect the Royal Bengal Tigers in the Sundarbans delta in Bangladesh.